John Arthur Johnson (born September 26, 1915), nicknamed "Long John", is an American former Negro league pitcher who played between 1938 and 1946.

A native of De Soto Parish, Louisiana, Johnson made his Negro leagues debut in 1938 with the Newark Eagles. He played for the Baltimore Elite Giants the following season, and went on to play for the Homestead Grays during their 1944 Negro World Series championship season. Johnson finished his career with a two-year stint with the New York Black Yankees in 1945 and 1946.

References

External links
 and Seamheads

1915 births
Baltimore Elite Giants players
Homestead Grays players
New York Black Yankees players
Newark Eagles players
Baseball pitchers
Baseball players from Louisiana
People from DeSoto Parish, Louisiana
Possibly living people